Cyrtodactylus robustus is a species of gecko that is endemic to Rossel Island in Papua New Guinea.

References 

Cyrtodactylus
Reptiles described in 2008